Plămădeală is a Moldovan surname that may refer to:

Alexandru Plămădeală (1888–1940), Moldovan sculptor
Antonie Plămădeală (1926–2005), high-level hierarch of the Romanian Orthodox Church
Vitalie Plămădeală (born 1985), Moldovan footballer

Surnames of Moldovan origin